Photographos (meaning photographer) is a Greek photography and imaging magazine, published monthly by Press Photo Publications and distributed  with the Greek newspaper, Kathimerini and autonomously, the penultimate Saturday of each month ( this month). 

The magazine provides articles on equipment reviews, photographic and editing techniques, photographic history and profiles of professional photographers.

About the magazine 
Photographos is the longest running and most established photo magazine in Greece. Its first issue was published on December 5, 1989. From 1989 to 1994, the magazine was published semimonthly and in October 2003 the cooperation with Kathimerini began.
The magazine is a member of the Technical Image Press Association (TIPA), the European Federation of Magazine Publishers (FAEP) and the International Federation of the Periodical Press (FIPP).

The activities of the magazine include the edition of books on photography and the organization of seminars for amateur and professional photographers. The Press Photo Publications company organizes every two years (since 1995), PHOTOVISION, the largest trade fair for the photographic and imaging industries in Greece.

References

External links
Photographos Magazine (official website) 
PHOTOVISION Fair (official website)
Technical Image Press Association (TIPA) - Photographos' Profile TIPA.com

1989 establishments in Greece
Greek-language magazines
Magazines established in 1989
Magazines published in Greece
Mass media in Athens
Monthly magazines
Photography magazines
Photography in Greece